Well-known reactions and reagents in organic chemistry include

0-9

1,2-Wittig rearrangement
1,3-Dipolar cycloaddition
2,3-Wittig rearrangement

A

Abramovitch–Shapiro tryptamine synthesis
Acetalisation
Acetoacetic ester condensation
Achmatowicz reaction
Acylation
Acyloin condensation
Adams' catalyst
Adams decarboxylation
Adkins catalyst
Adkins–Peterson reaction
Akabori amino acid reaction
Alcohol oxidation
Alder ene reaction
Alder–Stein rules
Aldol addition
Aldol condensation
Algar–Flynn–Oyamada reaction
Alkylimino-de-oxo-bisubstitution
Alkyne trimerisation
Alkyne zipper reaction
Allan–Robinson reaction
Allylic rearrangement
Amadori rearrangement
Amine alkylation
Angeli–Rimini reaction
Andrussov oxidation
Appel reaction
Arbuzov reaction, Arbusow reaction
Arens–Van Dorp synthesis, Isler modification
Aromatic nitration
Arndt–Eistert synthesis
Aston–Greenburg rearrangement
Auwers synthesis
Aza-Cope rearrangement
Azo coupling

B
Baeyer–Drewson indigo synthesis
Baeyer–Villiger oxidation, Baeyer–Villiger rearrangement
Bakeland process (Bakelite)
Baker–Venkataraman rearrangement, Baker–Venkataraman transformation
Baldwin's Rules
Bally–Scholl synthesis
Balz–Schiemann reaction
Bamberger rearrangement
Bamberger triazine synthesis
Bamford–Stevens reaction
Barbier reaction
Barbier–Wieland degradation
Bardhan–Sengupta phenanthrene synthesis
Barfoed's test
Bargellini reaction
Bartoli indole synthesis, Bartoli reaction
Barton decarboxylation
Barton reaction
Barton–Kellogg reaction
Barton–McCombie reaction, Barton deoxygenation
Barton-Zard Synthesis
Barton vinyl iodine procedure
Baudisch reaction
Bayer test
Baylis–Hillman reaction
Bechamp reaction
Bechamp reduction
Beckmann fragmentation
Beckmann rearrangement
Bellus–Claisen rearrangement
Belousov–Zhabotinsky reaction
Benary reaction
Benedict's reagent
Benkeser reaction
Benzidine rearrangement
Benzilic acid rearrangement
Benzoin condensation
Bergman cyclization
Bergmann azlactone peptide synthesis
Bergmann degradation
Bergmann–Zervas carbobenzoxy method
Bernthsen acridine synthesis
Bestmann's reagent
Betti reaction
Biginelli pyrimidine synthesis
Biginelli reaction
Bingel reaction
Birch reduction
Bischler–Möhlau indole synthesis
Bischler–Napieralski reaction
Biuret test
Blaise ketone synthesis
Blaise reaction
Blanc reaction
Blanc chloromethylation
Blum–Ittah aziridine synthesis
Bodroux reaction
Bodroux–Chichibabin aldehyde synthesis
Bogert–Cook synthesis
Bohlmann-Rahtz pyridine synthesis
Bohn–Schmidt reaction
Boord olefin synthesis
Borodin reaction
Borsche–Drechsel cyclization
Bosch–Meiser urea process
Bosch reaction
Bouveault aldehyde synthesis
Bouveault–Blanc reduction
Boyland–Sims oxidation
Boyer Reaction
Bredt's rule
Brook rearrangement
Brown hydroboration
Bucherer carbazole synthesis
Bucherer reaction
Bucherer–Bergs reaction
Buchner ring enlargement
Büchner–Curtius–Schlotterbeck reaction
Buchwald–Hartwig amination
Bunnett reaction
Burgess reagent

C

Cadiot–Chodkiewicz coupling
Cadogan-Sundberg indole synthesis
Camps quinoline synthesis
Cannizzaro reaction
Carbohydrate acetalisation
Carbonyl reduction
Carbonylation
Carbylamine reaction
Carroll reaction
Castro–Stephens coupling
Catalytic reforming
Catellani Reaction
CBS reduction
Chan–Lam coupling
Chapman rearrangement
Cheletropic reaction
Chichibabin pyridine synthesis
Chichibabin reaction
Chiral pool synthesis
Chugaev elimination
Ciamician–Dennstedt rearrangement
Claisen condensation
Claisen rearrangement
Claisen–Schmidt condensation
Clemmensen reduction
Collins reagent
Combes quinoline synthesis
Conia reaction
Conrad–Limpach synthesis
Cook–Heilbron thiazole synthesis
Cope elimination
Cope rearrangement
Corey reagent
Corey–Bakshi–Shibata reduction
Corey–Fuchs reaction
Corey–Gilman–Ganem oxidation
Corey–Kim oxidation
Corey-Nicolaou macrolactonization
Corey–Posner, Whitesides–House reaction
Corey-Seebach reaction
Corey–Winter olefin synthesis
Corey–Winter reaction
Cornforth rearrangement
Coupling reaction
Crabbé reaction
Craig method
Cram's rule of asymmetric induction
Creighton process
Criegee reaction
Criegee rearrangement
Cross metathesis
Crum Brown–Gibson rule
Curtius degradation
Curtius rearrangement, Curtius reaction
Cyanohydrin reaction

D
Dakin reaction (aka Dakin oxidation)
Dakin–West reaction
Danheiser annulation
Danheiser benzannulation
Darapsky degradation
Darzens condensation, Darzens–Claisen reaction, Glycidic ester condensation
Darzens halogenation
Darzens synthesis of unsaturated ketones
Darzens tetralin synthesis
Davis' reagent, Davis oxidation
Davis–Beirut reaction
De Kimpe aziridine synthesis
Dehydration reaction
Dehydrogenation
Delépine reaction
DeMayo reaction
Demjanov rearrangement
Demjanow desamination
Dess–Martin oxidation
Diazoalkane 1,3-dipolar cycloaddition
Diazotisation
DIBAL-H selective reduction
Dieckmann condensation
Dieckmann reaction
Diels–Alder reaction
Diels–Reese reaction
Dienol–benzene rearrangement
Dienone–phenol rearrangement
Dimroth rearrangement
Di-π-methane rearrangement
Directed ortho metalation
Doebner modification
Doebner reaction
Doebner–Miller reaction, Beyer method for quinolines
Doering–LaFlamme carbon chain extension
Dötz reaction
Dowd–Beckwith ring expansion reaction
Duff reaction
Dutt–Wormall reaction
Dyotropic reaction

E
E1cB elimination reaction
Eder reaction
Edman degradation
Eglinton reaction
Ehrlich–Sachs reaction
Einhorn variant
Einhorn–Brunner reaction
Elbs persulfate oxidation
Elbs reaction
Electrochemical fluorination
Electrocyclic reaction
Electrophilic halogenation
Electrophilic amination
Elimination reaction
Emde degradation
Emmert reaction
Enders SAMP/RAMP hydrazone-alkylation reaction
Ene reaction
Enyne metathesis
Epoxidation
Erlenmeyer synthesis, Azlactone synthesis
Erlenmeyer–Plöchl azlactone and amino-acid synthesis
Eschenmoser fragmentation
Eschenmoser sulfide contraction
Eschweiler–Clarke reaction
Ester pyrolysis
Ether cleavage
Étard reaction
Evans aldol
Evans–Saksena reduction
Evans–Tishchenko reaction

F
Favorskii reaction
Favorskii rearrangement
Favorskii–Babayan synthesis
Fehling test
Feist–Benary synthesis
Fenton reaction
Ferrario reaction
Ferrier carbocyclization
Ferrier rearrangement
Fétizon oxidation
Fiesselmann thiophene synthesis
Finkelstein reaction
Fischer indole synthesis
Fischer oxazole synthesis
Fischer peptide synthesis
Fischer phenylhydrazine and oxazone reaction
Fischer glycosidation
Fischer–Hepp rearrangement
Fischer–Speier esterification
Fischer Tropsch synthesis
Fleming–Tamao oxidation
Flood reaction
Folin–Ciocalteu reagent
Formox process
Forster reaction
Forster–Decker method
Fowler process
Franchimont reaction
Frankland synthesis
Frankland–Duppa reaction
Fráter–Seebach alkylation
Free radical halogenation
Freund reaction
Friedel–Crafts acylation
Friedel–Crafts alkylation
Friedländer synthesis
Fries rearrangement
Fritsch–Buttenberg–Wiechell rearrangement
Fujimoto–Belleau reaction
Fujiwara–Moritani reaction
Fukuyama coupling
Fukuyama indole synthesis
Fukuyama reduction

G

Gabriel ethylenimine method
Gabriel synthesis
Gabriel–Colman rearrangement, Gabriel isoquinoline synthesis
Gallagher–Hollander degradation
Gassman indole synthesis
Gastaldi synthesis
Gattermann aldehyde synthesis
Gattermann Koch reaction
Gattermann reaction
Geminal halide hydrolysis
Gewald reaction
Gibbs phthalic anhydride process
Gilman reagent
Glaser coupling
Glycol cleavage
Gomberg–Bachmann reaction
Gomberg–Bachmann–Hey reaction
Gomberg radical reaction
Gould–Jacobs reaction
Graebe–Ullmann synthesis
Grignard degradation
Griesbaum coozonolysis
Grignard reaction
Grob fragmentation
Grubbs' catalyst in Olefin metathesis
Grundmann aldehyde synthesis
Gryszkiewicz–Trochimowski and McCombie method
Guareschi–Thorpe condensation
Guerbet reaction
Gutknecht pyrazine synthesis

H

Hajos–Parrish–Eder–Sauer–Wiechert reaction
Haller–Bauer reaction
Haloform reaction
Halogen addition reaction
Halohydrin formation reaction
Hammett equation
Hammick reaction
Hammond principle or Hammond postulate
Hantzsch pyrrole synthesis
Hantzsch dihydropyridine synthesis, Hantzsch pyridine synthesis
Hantzsch pyridine synthesis, Gattermann–Skita synthesis, Guareschi–Thorpe condensation, Knoevenagel–Fries modification
Hantzsch–Collidin synthesis
Harries ozonide reaction
Haworth methylation
Haworth Phenanthrene synthesis
Haworth reaction
Hay coupling
Hayashi rearrangement
Heck reaction
Hegedus indole synthesis
Helferich method
Hell–Volhard–Zelinsky halogenation
Hemetsberger indole synthesis
Hemetsberger–Knittel synthesis
Henkel reaction, Raecke process, Henkel process
Henry reaction, Kamlet reaction
Herz reaction, Herz compounds
Herzig–Meyer alkimide group determination
Heumann indigo synthesis
Hiyama coupling
Hydration reaction
Hydroamination
Hydrodesulfurization
Hydrogenolysis
Hydrosilylation
Hinsberg indole synthesis
Hinsberg oxindole synthesis
Hinsberg reaction
Hinsberg separation
Hinsberg sulfone synthesis
Hirao coupling
Hoch–Campbell ethylenimine synthesis
Hock rearrangement
Hofmann bromamide reaction
Hofmann degradation, Exhaustive methylation
Hofmann elimination
Hofmann Isonitrile synthesis, Carbylamine reaction
Hofmann product
Hofmann rearrangement
Hofmann–Löffler reaction, Löffler–Freytag reaction, Hofmann–Löffler–Freytag reaction
Hofmann–Martius rearrangement
Hofmann's rule
Hofmann–Sand reaction
Homo rearrangement of steroids
Hooker reaction
Horner–Wadsworth–Emmons reaction
Hoesch reaction
Hosomi–Sakurai reaction
Houben–Fischer synthesis
Hudlicky fluorination
Huisgen cycloaddition
Hunsdiecker reaction, Hunsdiecker–Borodin reaction
Hurd-Mori 1,2,3-thiadiazole synthesis
Hydroboration
Hydrocarbon cracking
Hydrohalogenation

I
Indium mediated allylation
Ing–Manske procedure
Ipso substitution
Ireland–Claisen rearrangement
Isay reaction
Ishikawa reagent
trans-cis isomerism
Ivanov reagent, Ivanov reaction

J

Jacobsen epoxidation
Jacobsen rearrangement
Janovsky reaction
Japp–Klingemann reaction
Japp–Maitland condensation
Jocic reaction
Johnson–Claisen rearrangement
Johnson–Corey–Chaykovsky reaction
Jones oxidation
Jordan–Ullmann–Goldberg synthesis
Julia olefination, Julia–Lythgoe olefination

K

Kabachnik–Fields reaction
Kharasch–Sosnovsky reaction
Keck asymmetric allylation
Ketimine Mannich reaction
Ketone halogenation
Kiliani–Fischer synthesis
Kindler reaction
Kishner cyclopropane synthesis
Knoevenagel condensation
Knorr pyrazole synthesis
Knorr pyrrole synthesis
Knorr quinoline synthesis
Koch–Haaf reaction
Kochi reaction
Koenigs–Knorr reaction
Kolbe electrolysis
Kolbe nitrile synthesis
Kolbe–Schmitt reaction
Kornblum oxidation
Kornblum–DeLaMare rearrangement
Kostanecki acylation
Kowalski ester homologation
Krapcho decarboxylation
Krische allylation
Kröhnke aldehyde synthesis
Kröhnke oxidation
Kröhnke pyridine synthesis
Kucherov reaction
Kuhn–Winterstein reaction
Kulinkovich reaction
Kumada coupling

L

Larock indole synthesis
Lawesson's reagent
Lebedev process
Lehmstedt–Tanasescu reaction
Leimgruber–Batcho indole synthesis
Letts nitrile synthesis
Leuckart reaction
Leuckart thiophenol reaction
Leuckart–Wallach reaction
Leuckart amide synthesis
Levinstein process
Ley oxidation
Lieben iodoform reaction, Haloform reaction
Liebeskind–Srogl coupling
Liebig melamine synthesis
Lindlar catalyst
Lobry de Bruyn–Van Ekenstein transformation
Lombardo methylenation
Lossen rearrangement
Lucas' reagent
Luche reduction

M
Maillard reaction
Madelung synthesis
Malaprade reaction, Periodic acid oxidation
Malonic ester synthesis
Mannich reaction
Markó–Lam deoxygenation
Markovnikov's rule, Markownikoff rule, Markownikow rule
Marschalk reaction
Martinet dioxindole synthesis
McDougall monoprotection
McFadyen–Stevens reaction
McMurry reaction
Meerwein arylation
Meerwein–Ponndorf–Verley reduction
Meisenheimer rearrangement
Meissenheimer complex
Menshutkin reaction
Metal-ion-catalyzed σ-bond rearrangement
Mesylation
Merckwald asymmetric synthesis
Metallo-ene reaction
Methylation
Meyer and Hartmann reaction
Meyer reaction
Meyer synthesis
Meyer–Schuster rearrangement
Michael addition
Michael addition, Michael system
Michael condensation
Michaelis–Arbuzov reaction
Midland Alpine borane reduction
Mignonac reaction
Milas hydroxylation of olefins
Minisci reaction
Mislow–Evans rearrangement
Mitsunobu reaction
Miyaura borylation
Modified Wittig-Claisen tandem reaction
Molisch's test
Mozingo reduction
Mukaiyama aldol addition (Mukaiyama reaction)
Mukaiyama hydration
Myers' asymmetric alkylation

N

Nametkin rearrangement
Narasaka–Prasad reduction
Nazarov cyclization reaction
Neber rearrangement
Nef reaction
Negishi coupling
Negishi zipper reaction
Nenitzescu indole synthesis
Nenitzescu reductive acylation
Newman–Kwart rearrangement
Nicholas reaction
Niementowski quinazoline synthesis
Niementowski quinoline synthesis
Nierenstein reaction
NIH shift
Ninhydrin test
Nitroaldol reaction
Nitrone-olefin 3+2 cycloaddition
Normant reagents
Noyori asymmetric hydrogenation
Nozaki–Hiyama–Kishi reaction
Nucleophilic acyl substitution

O

Ohira–Bestmann reaction
Olah reagent
Olefin metathesis
Oppenauer oxidation
Ostromyslenskii reaction, Ostromisslenskii reaction
Overman rearrangement
Oxidative decarboxylation
Oxo synthesis
Oxy-Cope rearrangement
Oxymercuration
Oxidation of secondary alcohols to ketones
Ozonolysis

P

Paal–Knorr pyrrole synthesis
Paal–Knorr synthesis
Paneth technique
Passerini reaction
Paternò–Büchi reaction
Pauson–Khand reaction
Payne rearrangement
Pechmann condensation
Pechmann pyrazole synthesis
Pellizzari reaction
Pelouze synthesis
Peptide synthesis
Perkin alicyclic synthesis
Perkin reaction
Perkin rearrangement
Perkow reaction
Petasis reaction
Petasis reagent
Peterson olefination
Peterson reaction
Petrenko-Kritschenko piperidone synthesis
Pfau–Plattner azulene synthesis
Pfitzinger reaction
Pfitzner–Moffatt oxidation
Phosphonium coupling
Photosynthesis
Piancatelli rearrangement
Pictet–Gams isoquinoline synthesis
Pictet–Hubert reaction
Pictet–Spengler tetrahydroisoquinoline synthesis
Pictet–Spengler reaction
Piloty–Robinson pyrrole synthesis
Pinacol coupling reaction
Pinacol rearrangement
Pinner amidine synthesis
Pinner method for ortho esters
Pinner reaction
Pinner triazine synthesis
Pinnick oxidation
Piria reaction
Polonovski reaction
Pomeranz–Fritsch reaction
Ponzio reaction
Prato reaction
Prelog strain
Prevost reaction
Prileschajew reaction
Prilezhaev reaction
Prins reaction
Prinzbach synthesis
Protecting group
Pschorr reaction
Pummerer rearrangement
Purdie methylation, Irvine–Purdie methylation
PUREX

Q

Quelet reaction

R

Ramberg–Bäcklund reaction
Raney nickel
Rap–Stoermer condensation
Raschig phenol process
Rauhut–Currier reaction
Racemization
Reductive amination
Reductive dehalogenation of halo ketones
Reed reaction
Reformatskii reaction, Reformatsky reaction
Reilly–Hickinbottom rearrangement
Reimer–Tiemann reaction
Reissert indole synthesis
Reissert reaction, Reissert compound
Reppe synthesis
Retropinacol rearrangement
Rieche formylation
Riemschneider thiocarbamate synthesis
Riley oxidations
Ring closing metathesis
Ring opening metathesis
Ritter reaction
Robinson annulation
Robinson–Gabriel synthesis
Robinson Schopf reaction
Rosenmund reaction
Rosenmund reduction
Rosenmund–von Braun synthesis
Roskamp reaction
Rothemund reaction
Rupe rearrangement
Rubottom oxidation
Ruff–Fenton degradation
Ruzicka large-ring synthesis

S

Saegusa–Ito oxidation
Sakurai reaction
Salol reaction
Sandheimer
Sandmeyer diphenylurea isatin synthesis
Sandmeyer isonitrosoacetanilide isatin synthesis
Sandmeyer reaction
Sanger reagent
Saponification
Sarett oxidation
Schiemann reaction
Schiff reaction
Schiff test
Schlenk equilibrium
Schlosser modification
Schlosser variant
Schmidlin ketene synthesis
Schmidt degradation
Schmidt reaction
Scholl reaction
Schorigin Shorygin reaction, Shorygin reaction, Wanklyn reaction
Schotten–Baumann reaction
Seliwanoff's test
Semidine rearrangement
Semmler–Wolff reaction
Seyferth–Gilbert homologation
Shapiro reaction
Sharpless asymmetric dihydroxylation
Sharpless epoxidation
Sharpless oxyamination or aminohydroxylation
Shenck ene reaction
Shi epoxidation
Sigmatropic reaction
Simmons–Smith reaction
Simonini reaction
Simonis chromone cyclization
Simons process
Skraup chinolin synthesis
Skraup reaction
Smiles rearrangement
SNAr nucleophilic aromatic substitution
SN1
SN2
SNi
Solvolysis
Sommelet reaction
Sonn–Müller method
Sonogashira coupling
Sørensen formol titration
Staedel–Rugheimer pyrazine synthesis
Stahl oxidation
Staudinger reaction
Staudinger synthesis
Steglich esterification
Stephen aldehyde synthesis
Stetter reaction
Stevens rearrangement
Stieglitz rearrangement
Stille coupling
Stobbe condensation
Stollé synthesis
Stork acylation
Stork enamine alkylation
Strecker amino acid synthesis
Strecker degradation
Strecker sulfite alkylation
Strecker synthesis
Stereocontrolled 1,2-addition to carbonyl groups
Suzuki coupling
Swain equation
Swarts reaction
Swern oxidation

T

Tamao oxidation
Tafel rearrangement
Takai olefination
Tebbe olefination
ter Meer reaction
Thiele reaction
Thiol-yne reaction
Thorpe reaction
Tiemann rearrangement
Tiffeneau ring enlargement reaction
Tiffeneau–Demjanov rearrangement
Tischtschenko reaction
Tishchenko reaction, Tishchenko–Claisen reaction
Tollens reagent
Transfer hydrogenation
Trapp mixture
Transesterification
Traube purine synthesis
Truce–Smiles rearrangement
Tscherniac–Einhorn reaction
Tschitschibabin reaction
Tschugajeff reaction
Tsuji–Trost reaction
Tsuji–Wilkinson decarbonylation reaction
Twitchell process
Tyrer sulfonation process

U

Ugi reaction
Ullmann reaction
Upjohn dihydroxylation
Urech cyanohydrin method
Urech hydantoin synthesis

V

Van Leusen reaction
Van Slyke determination
Varrentrapp reaction
Vilsmeier reaction
Vilsmeier–Haack reaction
Voight amination
Volhard–Erdmann cyclization
von Braun amide degradation
von Braun reaction
von Richter cinnoline synthesis
von Richter reaction

W

Wacker–Tsuji oxidation
Wagner-Jauregg reaction 
Wagner–Meerwein rearrangement
Waits–Scheffer epoxidation
Walden inversion
Wallach rearrangement
Weerman degradation
Weinreb ketone synthesis
Wenker ring closure
Wenker synthesis
Wessely–Moser rearrangement
Westphalen–Lettré rearrangement
Wharton reaction
Whiting reaction
Wichterle reaction
Widman–Stoermer synthesis
Wilkinson catalyst
Willgerodt rearrangement
Willgerodt–Kindler reaction
Williamson ether synthesis
Winstein reaction
Wittig reaction
Wittig rearrangement:
1,2-Wittig rearrangement
2,3-Wittig rearrangement
Wittig–Horner reaction
Wohl degradation
Wohl–Aue reaction
Wohler synthesis
Wohl–Ziegler reaction
Wolffenstein–Böters reaction
Wolff rearrangement
Wolff–Kishner reduction
Woodward cis-hydroxylation
Woodward–Hoffmann rule
Wulff–Dötz reaction
Wurtz coupling, Wurtz reaction
Wurtz–Fittig reaction

Y
Yamada–Okamoto purine synthesis
Yamaguchi esterification

Z
Zaitsev's rule
Zeisel determination
Zerevitinov determination, Zerewitinoff determination
Ziegler condensation
Ziegler method
Zimmermann reaction
Zincke disulfide cleavage
Zincke nitration
Zincke reaction
Zincke–Suhl reaction
Zinin reduction

See also

 Stigler's law of eponymy
 Name reaction
 List of organic compounds
 List of inorganic compounds
 Named inorganic compounds
 List of biomolecules
 List of minerals

References

External links 

Chemistry-related lists